Virginia's third congressional district is a United States congressional district in the Commonwealth of Virginia, serving the independent cities of Norfolk, Newport News, Hampton, Portsmouth, and part of the independent city of Chesapeake. The district is represented by Democrat Bobby Scott.

VA-03 is majority-minority and has a plurality Black electorate, and is heavily Democratic.

Recent election results from statewide races

Historical composition of the district
In 1788 Virginia's 3rd Congressional District consisted of all of modern Virginia including and west of the counties of Carroll, Floyd, Roanoke, Botetourt, Augusta and Rockingham.  It also included what is today Pendleton County, West Virginia and also about the southern third of West Virginia which in 1788 was all Greenbrier County.  This area that is today about 48 counties and 13 independent cities was in 1788 only nine counties.

In the 1790 census this area had a population of 66,045.

For the 1792 congressional elections the number of congressional districts in Virginia rose from 10 to 19.  The only county that remained in the third district was Pendleton County.  Harrison, Randolph, Hardy, Hampshire, Monongalia and Ohio Counties, all now in West Virginia were also in the district.  This was all of northern West Virginia except the far eastern panhandle area.  The new district's 1790 population was 30,145.

The 1800 Census lead to another increase in Virginia's congressional districts in 1802.  The third district was again moved, this time to what was then Frederick and Shenandoah Counties in Virginia, which besides those counties also included the modern counties of Clarke, Warren and part of Page.  The new 3rd district had a population of 38,767 in 1800.

For most of the time from the end of the Civil War to 1993, the 3rd District was a relatively compact district centered on Richmond.

The district's current configuration dates to 1993, when the Justice Department ordered Virginia to create a majority-minority district.  At that time, portions of the old 1st, 2nd, 3rd and 4th districts were combined to create a new 3rd District.

The Virginia Legislature's 2012 redistricting was found unconstitutional, in part because of racial gerrymandering, and replaced was with a court-ordered map on January 16, 2016 for the 2016 elections. From 1993 to 2016, the 3rd had covered most of the majority-black precincts in and around Hampton Roads and Richmond.  The court-drawn map shifted the area near Richmond to the 4th District.

List of members representing the district

Election results

Historical district boundaries

See also

Virginia's congressional districts
List of United States congressional districts

Sources

 Congressional Biographical Directory of the United States 1774–present

03
Constituencies established in 1789
1789 establishments in Virginia
Constituencies disestablished in 1933
1933 disestablishments in Virginia
Constituencies established in 1935
1935 establishments in Virginia